Gustave Arthur Poujade (1845–1909, Fontainebleau)  was a French entomologist interested in Coleoptera and Lepidoptera. He was an honorary preparator in the Muséum national d'histoire naturelle in Paris. The museum holds his collections.
He described new species of Lepidoptera in Bulletin du Muséum national d'Histoire naturelle de Paris and Bulletin de la Société entomologique de France. He was especially interested in the butterflies and moths of Tibet. Gustave Poujade was a Member of Société entomologique de France.

References
Anonym 1909: [Poujade, G. A.] Bulletin de la Société Entomologique de France, Paris 1909:253–255 online
Constantin, R. 1992: Memorial des Coléopteristes Français. Bulletin de liaison de l'Association des Coléoptéristes de la région parisienne, Paris (Suppl. 14), S. 1–92 (page 75)
Lhoste, J. 1987: Les entomologistes français. 1750 – 1950. INRA (Institut National de la Recherche Agronomique), 1–355 (page 114)

French lepidopterists
1909 deaths
1845 births
National Museum of Natural History (France) people